The 2007 Los Angeles Avengers season was the eighth season for the franchise.  The Avengers began their season, trying to improve on their 5–11 record from 2006.  Their 9–7 record allowed them to clinch their first playoff spot since they won the division in 2005. After defeating the Utah Blaze 64–42, they lost 52–20 to the Chicago Rush in the divisional round. This was the final playoff appearance for the Avengers.

Season schedule

Playoff schedule

Coaching
Ed Hodgkiss is the head coach of the Avengers this season.

Stats

Offense

Quarterback

Running backs

Wide receivers

Touchdowns

Defense

Special teams

Kick return

Kicking

Playoff Stats

Offense

Quarterback

Running backs

Wide receivers

Special teams

Kick return

Kicking

Regular season

Week 1: vs San Jose Sabercats

at Staples Center, Los Angeles

Scoring summary:

1st Quarter:

SJ- Ben Nelson 6 yard pass from Mark Grieb (A.J. Haglund kick) – 7–0 SJ
LA- Lenzie Jackson 19 yard pass from Sonny Cumbie (Remy Hamilton kick) – 7–7
SJ- James Roe 12 yard pass from Mark Grieb (A.J. Haglund kick) – 14–7 SJ
SJ- Rodney Wright 1 yard run (A.J. Haglund kick) – 21–7 SJ

2nd Quarter:
LA- Lonnie Ford 6 yard run (Remy Hamilton kick) – 21–14 SJ
LA- Remy Hamilton 17 yard field goal – 21–17 SJ
SJ- Matt Kinsinger 1 yard run (A.J. Haglund kick) – 28–17 SJ
LA- Kevin Ingram 21 yard pass from Sonny Cumbie (Remy Hamilton kick) – 28–24 SJ
SJ- A.J. Haglund 26 yard field goal – 31–24 SJ
LA- Rob Turner 9 yard pass from Sonny Cumbie (Remy Hamilton kick) – 31–31
SJ- Ben Nelson 9 yard pass from Mark Grieb (A.J. Haglund kick) – 38–31 SJ

3rd Quarter:
LA – Kevin Ingram 14 yd pass from Sonny Cumbie (Remy Hamilton kick) – 38–38
SJ – Ben Nelson 24 yd pass from Mark Grieb (A.J. Haglund kick) – 45–38 SJ
LA – Lenzie Jackson 3 yd pass from Sonny Cumbie (Remy Hamilton kick) – 45–45
SJ – Ben Nelson 12 yd pass from Mark Grieb (A.J. Haglund kick) – 52–45 SJ
SJ – Rodney Wright 3 yd run (A.J. Haglund kick) – 59–45 SJ

4th Quarter:
LA – Lenzie Jackson 23 yd pass from Sonny Cumbie (Remy Hamilton kick) – 59–52 SJ
SJ – Rodney Wright 8 yd pass from Mark Grieb (A.J. Haglund kick) – 66–52 SJ
LA – Rob Turner 25 yd pass from Sonny Cumbie (Remy Hamilton kick failed) – 66–58 SJ

Attendance: 12,586

Week 2: @ Orlando Predators

at Hummer Field at Amway Arena, Orlando, Florida

Scoring summary:

1st Quarter:
10:52 LA – Remy Hamilton 26 yd field goal – 3–0 LA
06:11 ORL – Jay Taylor 31 yd field goal – 3–3
01:49 LA – Lenzie Jackson 17 yd pass from Sonny Cumbie (Remy Hamilton kick) – 10–3 LA

2nd Quarter:
12:03 LA – Lenzie Jackson 1 yd run (Remy Hamilton kick) – 17–3 LA
07:59 ORL – Shane Stafford 2 yd run (Jay Taylor kick) – 17–10 LA

3rd Quarter:
05:36 LA – Kevin Ingram 22 yd pass from Sonny Cumbie (Remy Hamilton kick failed) – 23–10 LA
03:17 ORL – DeAndrew Rubin 32 yd pass from Shane Stafford (Jay Taylor kick) – 23–17 LA

4th Quarter:
14:54 LA – Rob Turner 14 yd pass from Sonny Cumbie (Remy Hamilton kick) – 30–17 LA
12:07 ORL – DeAndrew Rubin 19 yd pass from Shane Stafford (Jay Taylor kick) – 30–24 LA
09:11 LA – Kevin Ingram 27 yd pass from Sonny Cumbie (Remy Hamilton kick) – 37–24 LA
06:26 ORL – Kevin Nagle 1 yd run (Jay Taylor kick failed) – 37–30 ORL
00:07 ORL – Javarus Dudley 23 yd pass from Shane Stafford (Jay Taylor kick) – 37–37

Overtime:
10:05 LA – Rob Turner 9 yd pass from Sonny Cumbie (Remy Hamilton kick) – 44–37 LA

Attendance: 12,787

Week 4: @ New Orleans VooDoo
at New Orleans Arena, New Orleans, Louisiana

Scoring summary:

1st Quarter:

2nd Quarter:

3rd Quarter:

4th Quarter:

Attendance: 16,668

Week 5: @ Chicago Rush
at Allstate Arena, Rosemont, Illinois

Scoring summary:

1st Quarter:

2nd Quarter:

3rd Quarter:

4th Quarter:

Attendance: 15,846

Week 6: vs Arizona Rattlers

at Staples Center, Los Angeles

Scoring summary:

1st Quarter:
07:42 LA – Lenzie Jackson 14 yd pass from Sonny Cumbie – 6–0 LA

2nd Quarter:
13:16 LA – Kevin Ingram 6 yd pass from Sonny Cumbie (Remy Hamilton kick) – 13–0 LA
09:24 ARI – Trandon Harvey 16 yd pass from Sherdrick Bonner (Gary Kral kick) – 13–7 LA
03:59 LA – Rob Turner 13 yd pass from Sonny Cumbie (Remy Hamilton kick) – 20–7 LA
01:59 ARI – Jeremiah Pope 18 yd pass from Sherdrick Bonner (Gary Kral kick) – 20–14 LA
00:39 LA – Remy Hamilton 33 yd field goal – 23–14 LA
00:00 ARI – Gary Kral 23 yd field goal – 23–17 LA

3rd Quarter:
13:48 ARI – Trandon Harvey 37 yd pass from Sherdrick Bonner (Gary Kral kick) – 24–23 ARI
10:45 LA – Lonnie Ford 3 yd run (Remy Hamilton kick) – 30–24 LA
05:18 ARI – Trandon Harvey 25 yd pass from Sherdrick Bonner (Gary Kral kick) – 31–30 ARI
02:17 LA – Rob Turner 5 yd pass from Sonny Cumbie (Remy Hamilton kick) – 37–31 LA
00:32 ARI – Jeremiah Pope 5 yd pass from Sherdrick Bonner (Gary Kral kick) – 38–37 ARI

4th Quarter:
10:16 LA – Kevin Ingram 7 yd pass from Sonny Cumbie (Remy Hamilton kick) – 44–38 LA
09:04 LA – Lenzie Jackson 0 yd net recovery (Remy Hamilton kick failed) – 50–38 LA
05:30 LA – Lonnie Ford 1 yd run (Remy Hamilton kick) – 57–38 LA
03:25 ARI – Bo Kelly 3 yd run (Gary Kral kick) – 57–45 LA
02:57 LA – Kevin Ingram 12 yd kickoff return (Remy Hamilton kick) – 64–45 LA

Attendance: 12,972

Week 7: @ Utah Blaze
at EnergySolutions Arena, Salt Lake City, Utah

Scoring summary:

1st Quarter:

2nd Quarter:

3rd Quarter:

4th Quarter:

Attendance: 13,497

Week 8: @ San Jose Sabercats
at the HP Pavilion at San Jose, San Jose, California

Scoring summary:

1st Quarter:

2nd Quarter:

3rd Quarter:

4th Quarter:

Attendance: 12,984

Week 9: vs Grand Rapids Rampage

at Staples Center, Los Angeles

Scoring summary:

1st Quarter:

2nd Quarter:

3rd Quarter:

4th Quarter:

Attendance: 15,088

Week 10: @ Las Vegas Gladiators
at Orléans Arena, Las Vegas, Nevada

Scoring summary:

1st Quarter:

2nd Quarter:

3rd Quarter:

4th Quarter:

Attendance: 5,698

Week 11: vs Tampa Bay Storm

at Staples Center, Los Angeles

Scoring summary:

1st Quarter:

2nd Quarter:

3rd Quarter:

4th Quarter:

Attendance: 12,439

Week 12: vs Georgia Force

at Staples Center, Los Angeles

Scoring summary:

1st Quarter:
11:49 GEO – Chris Jackson 8 yd pass from Chris Greisen (Jarrick Hillery rush failed) – 6–0 GEO
10:10 LA – LaShaun Ward 43 yd pass from Sonny Cumbie (Remy Hamilton kick failed) – 6–6

2nd Quarter:
14:09 LA – LaShaun Ward 13 yd pass from Sonny Cumbie (Remy Hamilton kick) – 13–6 LA
12:46 GEO – Troy Bergeron 36 yd pass from Chris Greisen (Carlos Martínez kick) – 13–13
07:23 LA – Remy Hamilton 17 yd field goal – 16–13 LA
06:52 GEO – Derek Lee 45 yd pass from Chris Greisen (Carlos Martínez kick) – 20–16 GEO
00:37 LA – Lonnie Ford 2 yd run (Remy Hamilton kick) – 23–20 LA
00:00 GEO – Carlos Martínez 31 yd field goal – 23–23

3rd Quarter:
11:55 LA – Robert Quiroga 5 yd pass from Sonny Cumbie (Remy Hamilton kick) – 30–23 LA
09:35 GEO – Chris Jackson 1 yd run (Carlos Martínez kick) – 30–30
06:11 LA – Rob Turner 18 yd pass from Sonny Cumbie (Remy Hamilton kick failed) – 36–30 LA

4th Quarter:
13:58 LA – LaShaun Ward 28 yd pass from Sonny Cumbie (Remy Hamilton kick) – 43–30 LA
11:34 LA – Robert Quiroga 12 yd pass from Sonny Cumbie (Remy Hamilton kick) – 50–30 LA
08:24 LA – LaShaun Ward 15 yd pass from Sonny Cumbie (Remy Hamilton kick) – 57–30 LA
06:21 GEO – Chris Jackson 12 yd pass from Chris Greisen (Carlos Martínez kick) – 57–37 LA
02:00 GEO – Derek Lee 11 yd pass from Chris Greisen (Carlos Martínez kick) – 57–44 LA
00:46 GEO – Troy Bergeron 9 yd pass from Chris Greisen (Carlos Martínez kick) – 57–51 LA

Attendance: 13,922

Week 13: @ Kansas City Brigade
at Kemper Arena, Kansas City, Missouri

Scoring summary:

1st Quarter:

2nd Quarter:

3rd Quarter:

4th Quarter:

Attendance: 13,213

Week 14: vs Chicago Rush

at Staples Center, Los Angeles

Scoring summary:

1st Quarter:
10:46 LA – Remy Hamilton 26 yd field goal – 3–0 LA
06:20 CHI – Rob Mager 19 yd pass from Matt D'Orazio (Dan Frantz kick) – 7–3 CHI
01:47 LA – Terrance Stubbs 10 yd pass from Sonny Cumbie (Remy Hamilton kick failed) – 9–7 LA

2nd Quarter:
14:18 CHI – Matt D'Orazio 6 yd run (Dan Frantz kick) – 14–9 CHI
08:51 LA – Lonnie Ford 1 yd run (Remy Hamilton kick) – 16–14 LA
04:49 CHI – DeJuan Alvonzo 10 yd pass from Matt D'Orazio – 20–16 CHI
00:33 LA – LaShaun Ward 13 yd pass from Sonny Cumbie (Remy Hamilton kick) – 23–20 LA
00:22 LA – Robert Quiroga 0 yd fumble recovery (Remy Hamilton kick) – 30–20 LA

3rd Quarter:
06:40 CHI – Joe Peters 1 yd run (Dan Frantz kick) – 30–27 LA
02:04 LA – Sonny Cumbie 5 yd run (Remy Hamilton kick) – 37–27 LA

4th Quarter:
14:55 CHI – Rob Mager 19 yd pass from Matt D'Orazio (DeJuan Alvonzo pass failed) – 37–33 LA
12:31 LA – Rob Turner 21 yd pass from Sonny Cumbie (Remy Hamilton kick) – 44–33 LA
09:12 CHI – Bob McMillen 3 yd pass from Matt D'Orazio (Dan Frantz kick failed) – 44–39 LA
05:20 LA – Remy Hamilton 33 yd field goal – 47–39 LA
04:16 CHI – Rob Mager 20 yd pass from Matt D'Orazio (Matt D'Orazio rush) – 47–47
00:00 LA – Remy Hamilton 29 yd field goal – 50–47 LA

Attendance: 13,142

Week 15: @ Arizona Rattlers
at the US Airways Center, Phoenix, Arizona

Scoring summary:

1st Quarter:

2nd Quarter:

3rd Quarter:

4th Quarter:

Attendance: 11,994

Week 16: vs Las Vegas Gladiators

at Staples Center, Los Angeles

Scoring summary:

1st Quarter:

2nd Quarter:

3rd Quarter:

4th Quarter:

Attendance: 12,482

Week 17: vs Utah Blaze

at Staples Center, Los Angeles

Scoring summary:

1st Quarter:

2nd Quarter:

3rd Quarter:

4th Quarter:

Attendance: 13,323

Playoffs

Week 1: vs (5) Utah Blaze

at Staples Center, Los Angeles

Scoring summary:

1st Quarter:

2nd Quarter:

3rd Quarter:

4th Quarter:

Attendance: 13,066

Offensive player of the game: Sonny Cumbie (LA)
Defensive player of the game: Silas Demary (LA)
Ironman of the game: Josh Jeffries (LA)

Week 2: at (2) Chicago Rush

at Allstate Arena, Rosemont, Illinois

Scoring summary:

1st Quarter:

2nd Quarter:

3rd Quarter:

4th Quarter:

Attendance:

Offensive player of the game:
Defensive player of the game:
Ironman of the game:

External links
Official page at arenafootball.com

Los Angeles Avengers
Los Angeles Avengers seasons